The 1888 Calgary municipal election was held on January 3, 1888 to elect a Mayor and six Councillors to sit on the fourth Calgary Town Council from January 16, 1888 to January 21, 1889.

The 1888 election was the first after the Town Council had expanded from four councillors to six councillors.

Background
Nominations for council opened on December 27, 1887 and E. P. Davis was named returning officer, and the town fire hall was selected as the his headquarters. Former Mayors George Murdoch, George Clift King and Arthur Edwin Shelton were nominated for the position of mayor. A public meeting was called a 2 p.m. later in the day to give speeches, which became so pointed and personal that several of the Aldermanic candidates withdrew their nominations.

Results

Mayor

Councillors
Six councillors were elected in this election. 
Election was conducted using Plurality block voting. Each voter could cast up to six votes.

See also
List of Calgary municipal elections

References

Sources

Municipal elections in Calgary
1888 elections in Canada
1880s in Calgary